Leslie Hatfield Palmer, Jr. (December 15, 1923 –  April 15, 2006) was an American football defensive back who played one season with the Philadelphia Eagles of the National Football League. He played college football at North Carolina State University and attended East Bank High School in East Bank, West Virginia.

References

External links
Just Sports Stats

1923 births
2006 deaths
Players of American football from West Virginia
American football defensive backs
NC State Wolfpack football players
Philadelphia Eagles players
People from Kanawha County, West Virginia